Simon Zavarian (Armenian: , also known by his nom de guerre Anton, ; 1866 – 1913) was a leader of the Armenian national liberation movement and one of the three founders of the Armenian Revolutionary Federation, along with Kristapor Mikaelian and Stepan Zorian.

Biography
Zavarian was born in the village of Igahat in the Tiflis Governorate of the Russian Empire (now Aygehat in Lori Province, Armenia). He graduated from the Nersisian School in Tiflis, then attended the Petrovsky Agricultural Academy in Moscow, where he met Kristapor Mikaelian and Stepan Zorian. In Moscow, he became a member of the Russian revolutionary organization Narodnaya Volya. He later settled in Tiflis, where he co-founded the Armenian Revolutionary Federation (ARF) with Kristapor Mikaelian and Stepan Zorian in 1890.

Zavarian played a prominent role in the creation of the party's plans and rules and served as the executive officer of the party's eastern Bureau. He also conducted research for the party and performed organizational work during his many travels across Europe and the Ottoman Empire. In 1902, he went to Geneva, where he served as a member of the editorial board of Droshak, the ARF's official newspaper.

During the 1908 Ottoman Constitutional Revolution, he participated in the development of plans for reforms for Ottoman Armenians and used the archives of the Armenian Patriarchate of Constantinople to develop a census of the number of Armenians living in Western Armenia. After 1908, Zavarian traveled to Mush and Sassoun as a teacher and inspector-general of Armenian schools. He settled in Constantinople in 1911, where he taught at the Yessayan School and worked on the ARF newspaper Azadamard.

Zavarian died of a heart attack in 1913 in Constantinople. He was buried in Tiflis.

See also
 Armenian Revolutionary Federation
 Christapor Mikaelian
 Stepan Zorian

References

Sources
Simon Zavarian biography in English and Armenian 
 Mihran Kurdoghlian, Badmoutioun Hayots, C. Hador (translators from the Armenian), Armenian History, volume III, p. 34, Athens, Greece: 1996

External links 
 

1866 births
1913 deaths
Armenian revolutionaries
People from Lori Province
Burials at Armenian Pantheon of Tbilisi
Armenian independence activists